Pyodermatitis vegetans can refer to:
 Pyostomatitis vegetans
 Blastomycosis-like pyoderma